Paraskevas Antzas (born 18 August 1977) is a Greek former professional footballer who played as a central defender.

Career
Antzas' career began in Pandramaikos F.C. in Gamma Ethniki in 1993. In 1995, he signed with Skoda Xanthi at Super League. In 1998, he signed with Greek Olympiacos and until 2003 he played in 76 league games plus 20 international games ( 18 games in UEFA Champions League and 2 games in UEFA Europa League scoring one goal). In 2003, he left Olympiacos, for still an unexplained reason, while he was a key member of the Greece and had been qualified for the European Championship 2004 in Portugal. In 2003 was announced that stops the football for family reasons. He changed his mind and signed with Doxa Drama, on loan from Olympiakos, and consequently he lost his place in the Greece, and he regained it years after in 2007 when he returned to Olympiacos from Skoda Xanthi.

On 15 June 2008, one day after the defeat of Greece from Russia in the final tournament of Euro 2008, Antzas announced his retirement from international football. On 3 May 2009, he played his last career game.

Honours

Club
Olympiacos
Superleague Greece (7): 1998–99, 1999–2000, 2000–01, 2001–02, 2002–03, 2007–08, 2008–09
Greek Cup (3): 1998–99, 2007–08, 2008–09
Greek Super Cup: 2007

Greece
 UEFA Euro U21: Runner-up 1998

References

External links

Paraskeuas Antzas Personal Site (Greek)

1977 births
Greek footballers
Greece international footballers
Greece under-21 international footballers
UEFA Euro 2008 players
Living people
Association football defenders
Olympiacos F.C. players
Xanthi F.C. players
Doxa Drama F.C. players
Footballers from Drama, Greece
Super League Greece players